Rolf Beutler (born 4 December 1940) is a Swiss sports shooter. He competed at the 1984 Summer Olympics and the 1988 Summer Olympics.

References

1940 births
Living people
Swiss male sport shooters
Olympic shooters of Switzerland
Shooters at the 1984 Summer Olympics
Shooters at the 1988 Summer Olympics
Place of birth missing (living people)